Kreitzer Glacier is a glacier flowing northwest between Jennings Promontory and the Reinbolt Hills into the eastern part of the Amery Ice Shelf, Antarctica. It was delineated in 1952 by John H. Roscoe from aerial photographs taken by U.S. Navy Operation Highjump, 1946–47, and was named by Roscoe for Lieutenant William R. Kreitzer, U.S. Navy, commander of one of the three Operation Highjump aircraft used in photographing this and other coastal areas between 14°E and 164°E.

See also
 List of glaciers in the Antarctic
 Glaciology

Further reading 
 Christopher Jones, Fire and Ice, P 177

References

External links 
 Operation Highjump

Glaciers of Ingrid Christensen Coast